The Bermuda Triangle is a region in the western part of the North Atlantic Ocean where a number of aircraft and surface vessels allegedly disappeared mysteriously.

Bermuda Triangle may also refer to:

Music
 Bermuda Triangle (album), a 2002 album by BucketHead
 "Bermuda Triangle" (song), a 1980 song by Barry Manilow
 "Bermuda Triangle", a song by Fleetwood Mac from their 1974 album Heroes Are Hard to Find
 Bermuda Triangle (Tomita album), a 1979 album by Isao Tomita
 Bermuda Triangle Band, an American folk rock band formed in 1967

Amusement park rides
 Bermuda Triangle (Sea World), a former water ride of Sea World
 Bermuda Triangle: Alien Encounter, a water ride at Movie Park Germany

Other uses
 The Bermuda Triangle (book), a 1974 book by Charles Berlitz
 The Bermuda Triangle (film), a 1978 film starring John Huston and Gloria Guida
 Bermuda Triangle (video game), a 1987 video game
 Bermuda Triangle: Colorful Pastrale, a 2019 anime TV series produced by Seven Arcs Pictures

See also
 The Triangle (TV miniseries), 2005 science fiction drama about the Bermuda Triangle
 Triangle (disambiguation)